Clifton Royal is a rural community in Kings County New Brunswick, Canada. It is connected to Quispamsis via the Gondola Point Ferry.

History

Notable people

See also
List of communities in New Brunswick

References 

Communities in Kings County, New Brunswick